John L. Leedham (20 May 1928 – 30 May 2020) was an Australian rules footballer who is the vice captain of and ruck-rover in the official Tasmanian Football Team of the Century. He is also a 'legend' in the state's Football Hall of Fame.

Leedham, nicknamed 'John L', always played with his socks down and was known to be a colourful character on the field. He was brought up in Campbell Town and started his football career at North Launceston in 1946, aged 17. Playing as a centre half forward, Leedham was a member of NTFA premiership teams in 1946, 1948, 1949 and 1950 as well as three Tasmanian State Premierships. He was almost poached by the Melbourne Football Club in 1948 but a knee injury stopped him from making his debut in the VFL.

After 124 games with North Launceston, including a stint as captain-coach, Leedham crossed to TFL club North Hobart. He coached North Hobart from 1954 to 1959 and steered them to a premiership in 1957.

Leedham represented Tasmania at the 1947, 1953 and 1958 interstate carnivals. In 1953 he was named in the inaugural All-Australian side, the only Tasmanian, and in the 1958 Melbourne Carnival he captain-coached the state to famous wins against South Australia and Western Australia.

References

External links

1928 births
2020 deaths
Australian rules footballers from Tasmania
North Hobart Football Club players
North Hobart Football Club coaches
North Launceston Football Club players
North Launceston Football Club coaches
All-Australians (1953–1988)
Tasmanian Football Hall of Fame inductees